Lake Clare is a lake in Jackson County in the U.S. state of Missouri.

Lake Clare was named after Clara B. Bush, the wife of the original owner of the site.

References

Bodies of water of Jackson County, Missouri
Lakes of Missouri